Penny Cula-Reid (born 2 February 1988) is an Australian rules footballer who played for the Collingwood Football Club in the AFL Women's competition.

Prior to being signed for the national competition, she was a multiple premiership player in the Victorian Women's Football League and club captain for the St Kilda Sharks; she also represented Victoria at the under 19 national championships. She has also played cricket in the Victorian second XI and gridiron with the Victorian Maidens in the Lingerie Football League.

Cula-Reid was a member of the Australia women's international rules football team that played against Ireland in the 2006 Ladies' International Rules Series. 

She was involved in a sex discrimination case when she and two other girls challenged the Moorabbin Saints Junior Football League and Football Victoria Ltd's rules that forbid girls from playing in mixed sex teams after the age of twelve.  The case changed the rule from restricting girls from playing in the under 12s to the under 15s, which still prevented Cula-Reid from playing in mixed sex teams. She has been credited with "effectively forcing" AFL Victoria to create a youth girls competition. A documentary, Even Girls Play Footy, was made about the case.

She played two games in the 2017 season.

After being delisted, Cula-Reid was appointed senior coach of Collingwood's VFLW team ahead of the 2018 season. She led the Magpies to the minor premiership, and was named VFLW Coach of the Year.

See also
 List of Caulfield Grammar School people

References

External links

Lesbian sportswomen
Australian LGBT sportspeople
1988 births
Living people
Collingwood Football Club (AFLW) players
Australian rules footballers from Victoria (Australia)
LGBT players of Australian rules football
Australia women's international rules football team players
Victorian Women's Football League players